This is a list of singles that have peaked in the top 10 of the French Singles Chart in 2010. 72 singles reached the top ten during the year with 11 peaking at number one.

Top-ten singles

Entries by artists
The following table shows artists who achieved two or more top 10 entries in 2010. The figures include both main artists and featured artists and the peak positions in brackets.

See also
 2010 in music
 List of number-one singles of 2010 (France)

Top
France top 10
Top 10 singles in 2010
France 2010